Obianuju Blessing Okeke, popularly known as Uju Okeke, is an actress in Nigerian cinema. She had roles in Mission to No Where and The Barrister.

Personal life
Okeke was born in Anambra State. She is a graduate in theatre arts from Nnamdi Azikiwe University.

In 2012, she married her longtime partner, Melekh. The holy solemnization took place at Saint Barth Anglican Church in Lagos.

Career
In 2006, Okeke played the role of a maid in Teco Benson thriller film Mission to Nowhere. In 2007, she won the award for the Next Upcoming Actress at African Movie Academy Awards (AMAA) for her promising role in that film.

In 2018, she was honored by the department of theatre and film studies, Nnamdi Azikiwe University, Awka, Anambra State.

Filmography

References

External links
 

Living people
Residents of Lagos
Year of birth missing (living people)
Nigerian film actresses
Nnamdi Azikiwe University alumni
21st-century Nigerian actresses
Igbo actresses